The 2021–22 Saudi Professional League was the 46th edition of the Saudi Professional League, the top Saudi professional league for association football clubs, since its establishment in 1976. Fixtures for the 2021–22 season were announced on 18 July 2021.

Al-Hilal were the two-time defending champions after winning their 17th title last season. Al-Fayha, Al-Hazem, and Al-Tai join as the three promoted clubs from the 2020–21 MS League. They replace Al-Ain, Al-Qadsiah, and Al-Wehda who were relegated to the 2021–22 MS League.

On 27 June, Al-Hilal secured their eighteenth league title in the final matchday following a 2–1 home win against Al-Faisaly. It was also the club's third consecutive title and fifth in the last six seasons. Al-Hazem were the first team to be relegated following a 5–2 defeat away to Al-Ettifaq on 21 May. In the final matchday, both Al-Faisaly and Al-Ahli were relegated following a defeat to Al-Hilal and a draw with Al-Shabab respectively.

Overview

Sponsorship
On 8 August 2021, the Saudi Professional League announced that they had signed a sponsorship deal with real estate company Roshn. On 9 August 2021, the Saudi FF signed a sponsorship deal with Chinese tech company Lenovo to become the official technology partner of all Saudi football competitions.

Changes
On 8 August 2021, Ministry of Sports announced that they had increased the capacity limit from 40% to 60% in all stadiums. It was also announced that children under 12 wouldn't be allowed to attend matches and that the attendance would be limited to those who are fully vaccinated.

Teams

Sixteen teams will compete in the league – the top thirteen teams from the previous season and the three teams promoted from the MS League.

Teams who were promoted to the Pro League

The first club to be promoted was Al-Hazem, who were promoted following a 4–2 away win against Al-Sahel on 20 April 2021. Al-Hazem will play in the top flight of Saudi football after a season's absence. Al-Hazem were crowned champions following a 1–0 away win against Hajer on 21 May 2021.

The second club to be promoted was Al-Fayha, following a 0–0 home draw with Al-Tai on 20 May 2021. Al-Fayha will play in the top flight of Saudi football after a season's absence.

The third and final club to be promoted was Al-Tai who were promoted on the final matchday following a 2–0 away win over Arar. Al-Tai will play in the top flight of Saudi football for the first time since the 2007–08 season.

Teams who were relegated to the MS League

The first club to be relegated was Al-Ain, who were relegated after only a year in the top flight following a 2–0 defeat away to Al-Nassr on 14 May 2021.

In the final matchday, both Al-Qadsiah and Al-Wehda were relegated following a draw with Abha and a loss against Al-Shabab respectively. Al-Qadsiah were relegated after only a year in the top flight while Al-Wehda were relegated after three years in the top flight.

Stadiums
Note: Table lists in alphabetical order.

Personnel and kits 

 1 On the back of the strip.
 2 On the right sleeve of the strip.
 3 On the shorts.

Managerial changes

Foreign players
The policy of foreign players remained unchanged. Clubs can register a total of seven foreign players over the course of the season.

Players name in bold indicates the player is registered during the mid-season transfer window.

League table

Positions by round
The following table lists the positions of teams after each week of matches. In order to preserve the chronological evolution, any postponed matches are not included to the round at which they were originally scheduled but added to the full round they were played immediately afterward. If a club from the Saudi Professional League wins the King Cup, they will qualify for the AFC Champions League, unless they have already qualified for it through their league position. In this case, an additional AFC Champions League group stage berth will be given to the 3rd placed team, and the AFC Champions League play-off round spot will be given to 4th.

Results

Season statistics

Scoring

Top scorers

Hat-tricks 

Notes
(H) – Home; (A) – Away

Most assists

Clean sheets

Discipline

Player 

 Most yellow cards: 10
 Saeed Al-Rubaie (Al-Ettifaq)
 Ismael (Al-Faisaly)

 Most red cards: 2
 Marwane Saâdane (Al-Fateh)
 Ammar Al-Daheem (Al-Fateh)
 Abdullah Al-Shammeri (Al-Hazem)
 Mohammed Al-Khabrani (Al-Ahli)
 Éver Banega (Al-Shabab)
 Talisca (Al-Nassr)

Club 

 Most yellow cards: 77
 Al-Ahli
 Al-Taawoun

 Most red cards: 8
 Al-Ettifaq

Attendances

By round

By team
A match played behind closed doors is not included.

Awards

Monthly awards

References

1
Saudi Professional League seasons
Saudi Professional League